Claude Gernade Bowers (November 20, 1878 – January 21, 1958) was a newspaper columnist and editor, author of best-selling books on American history, Democratic Party politician, and President Franklin D. Roosevelt's ambassador to Spain (1933–1939) and Chile (1939–1953). His histories of the Democratic Party in its formative years from the 1790s to the 1830s helped shape the party's self-image as a powerful force against monopoly and privilege. Bowers was a sharp critic of Republicans and their Reconstruction policies for African American voting rights and civil rights.

Bowers was ambassador to Spain during the Spanish Civil War (1936–1939). At first he recommended the United States join other nations in a Non-intervention Agreement. When it soon became clear that Nazi Germany and Fascist Italy, in violation of the Agreement, were openly helping the Nationalist rebels, he unsuccessfully pressed Washington to aid the government of the Spanish Republic. He left Spain when it became clear, in early 1939, that the rebels, led by the dictator Francisco Franco, had won the war. Later that year, he became U.S. Ambassador to Chile, which had a leftist government more to his liking.

In domestic affairs he considered himself a staunch Jeffersonian, and was increasingly dismayed at the New Deal interventions into the economy, but kept quiet about it.

Three of Bower's books were genuine best-sellers, "but he is little remembered today except by political historians".

Biography
Bowers was the son of a small-time Indiana shopkeeper, Lewis Bowers, who died when he was 12. His mother, Juliet Tipton Bowers, moved to Indianapolis, and Bowers graduated from Shortridge High School there in 1898. He was a voracious reader: "Irish oratory, English poetry, and history of all kinds were his favorite study." He demonstrated "intellectual excitement". He was a champion debater, "when debate was more important than basketball", and won the Indiana State High School Oratorical Contest with a speech on "Hamilton the Constructionist."

Finances made college impossible; even high school (not dropping out of school to work) had been a financial challenge. Beyond high school, Bowers was self-taught.

He began his career in 1901 as a journalist writing editorials for the Indianapolis Sentinel, "filling in for a friend who wanted to go fishing". He worked as reporter and editorial writer for a variety of Indiana newspapers.

In 1903 Bowers left Indianapolis to work for the Terre Haute Gazette, and then moved to the Terre Haute Star as editorial writer. It was there that he became friends with Eugene V. Debs, head of the Socialist Party of America and repeated candidate for president and other offices on its "ticket".

At the urging of Terre Haute Representative and then Attorney General of Indiana John Edward Lamb, Bowers was chosen in 1904 as Democratic candidate for Congress for the district that includes Terre Haute. He campaigned hard but lost in a Republican landslide. He was renominated unanimously in 1904, but lost again. Though he lost, the experience polished his abundant speaking skills. He was "much in demand as a speaker". The political activity led to a "political position": he accepted an appointment to the Terre Haute Board of Public Improvements, serving unhappily from 1906 to 1911.

From 1911 to 1916 he was secretary to Senate majority leader John W. Kern. This allowed him access to leading politicians of the time, including President Woodrow Wilson. "He gained national prominence in the party." He defended the League of Nations, a principal project of Wilson. Since Kern was Democratic leader of the Senate and was absent from the office for days at a time because of caucuses, conferences, and floor strategy, Bowers did the full routine work, making him ex officio senator from Indiana. Kern was defeated in the 1916 election, and Bowers returned to Indiana and accepted a position at the Fort Wayne Journal-Gazette. Kern died in 1917 and Bowers published the following year a biography of him. Much later, Bowers published a biography of the man Kern defeated in 1910, Albert Beveridge.

Described as "an ardent Democrat", he was chairman of the Platform Committee of the Democratic Party in 1918. He declined the party's 1918 offer of the post of Indiana Secretary of State.

His book The Party Battles of the Jackson Period (1922) was well received, and led to a 1923 invitation, which he accepted, to join the editorial staff of the influential New York World, the nation's leading Democratic newspaper. When it folded in 1931, he became a political columnist for the New York Journal from 1931 to 1933.

He was a frequent public speaker, and in 1929 was described as "best known now as an orator", although "he gained first fame as a writer of historical works". He was a speechwriter for and advisor to 1928 presidential candidate Al Smith. He became a close friend of Franklin D. Roosevelt; the only book review Roosevelt ever wrote was in response to Bowers' request for a review of his 1925 Jefferson and Hamilton. "As a result of Roosevelt's lobbying", he was the keynote speaker at the 1928 Democratic National Convention. His speech was broadcast nationally by radio.

Ambassador
Bowers played a major role in Roosevelt's 1932 campaign for president; Roosevelt's overwhelming victory "virtually guaranteed Bowers some type of position in the new administration". Bowers requested appointment as ambassador to Spain, and Roosevelt was happy to choose him. While in Spain, where he was enormously popular as U.S. ambassador, and "established a reputation as 'a careful, painstaking executive,'" he continued to play an active role in the Democratic Party, as speechwriter, advisor, and publicist.

Bowers saw the Spanish peasants in Jeffersonian terms, and strongly supported the leftist elected government (Second Spanish Republic). When the Spanish Civil War erupted in 1936, at first he recommended support for the nonintervention policies that were agreed to by all the European powers. However, Germany and Italy openly violated that policy, and he switched and called on Washington, unsuccessfully, to help the Republic.  Bowers had little influence in Washington. Roosevelt told Bowers in 1939 that he had been right, we should not have remained neutral.) One of his main concerns was the safe evacuation of Americans caught in Spain by the war. In his memoir My Mission to Spain (1954) he was highly critical of  fascist agitation and strongly defended the Republic. He is responsible for the oft-repeated observation, which appeared in the subtitle of his book, that the Spanish Civil War was a dress rehearsal for World War II.

The 1939 victory of the Spanish fascists, led by Francisco Franco, made his position untenable, and he was recalled. Roosevelt soon chose him as ambassador to Chile, where he remained until 1953. "He was considered among the most popular and successful envoys in Latin America despite not being a professional diplomat and not speaking Spanish."

Although disillusioned when Roosevelt's New Deal veered the country away from pristine low-budget Jeffersonian principles, Bowers held his tongue and never criticized his patron.

He died of leukemia in 1958 and is buried at Highland Lawn Cemetery in Terre Haute, Indiana. He was survived by his widow, the former Sybil McCaslin, and a daughter, Patricia Bowers.

History books
Bowers wrote a series of best-selling popular histories, or "fighting popular histories", as one scholar put it.
Without a college education, he did not write innovative scholarship, and he shows no knowledge of the scholarly journals containing historical research. But he read widely, including when appropriate old newspapers and archival material, and gives references in footnotes.

History was for Bowers the story of personalities, and men were either heroes or villains. This was politics. "He early interpreted American history as a contest between privilege and democracy". He was "an historian of crisis, choosing his themes from the 'critical periods' of history: the triumph of democracy over aristocracy in the Jackson period, the epochal conflict of Jefferson and Hamilton, the retrograde decade after the Civil War, the election and administrations of Jefferson, and an act from the French drama of 1789."

In a review, historian William O. Lynch, also from Indiana, described Bowers in 1929 as "close to being an able historian". But "a more restrained style, more pro and con in the discussion of problems and men, and fewer unqualified opinions would vastly improve the works of this near-brilliant author." Unsophisticated readers need "protection against writers of the school of Mr. Bowers". Lynch predicted that Bowers' "harmful" histories would not be enduring works:

"[T]he volumes of Mr. Bowers would be much sounder, live longer and do less harm, had he understood that it is not so much the business of the historian to blame and praise, as to explain political leaders. Neither is it the chief business of the historian to drive his own interpretations into the minds of his readers with the most forceful English that he can command, but instead to present the truth clearly leaving his readers free to form their own conclusions in the presence of the evidence impartially stated. Within these limits, an engaging style should not be despised but welcomed.

Thomas Jefferson
Bowers' enormously popular books Party Battles of the Jackson Period (1922) and Jefferson and Hamilton: The Struggle for Democracy in America (1925) are critical of the Federalist Party, the Whig Party, and the Republican Party as bastions of aristocracy. Jefferson and Hamilton builds on the documentary evidence and analysis of Charles A. Beard's Economic Origins of Jeffersonian Democracy. He discusses the operations of Hamilton as Secretary of the Treasury in Washington's first administration. Hamilton worked on behalf of financial speculators, including at least two dozen members of Congress, to fund depreciated debts at their full face value (to their substantial benefit and the substantial loss of the original holders of the debts), and to establish a national bank on the same basis.

After their humiliating defeat in the 1924 elections Democrats "began to pray for 'another Thomas Jefferson' to put Humpty Dumpty together again.... [In Bowers' book they found] the myth of the Democratic party masterfully recreated, ...an ideology with which they might make sense of the too often senseless conflicts of the present." When Franklin Delano Roosevelt reviewed Jefferson and Hamilton as a favor to Bowers — the only book review Roosevelt ever wrote — he began with the words: "I felt like saying 'At last' as I read Mr. Claude G. Bowers’ thrilling
Jefferson and Hamilton."

Ex-Indiana Senator Albert J. Beveridge wrote a very long review of Jefferson and Hamilton, calling it "captivating". He wrote that Bowers "is master of the picturesque, which, in history and biography, is largely the human.... Mr. Bowers is frank and above board as a partisan of Jefferson, albeit an honest partisan. Moreover he tries to be fair, and he succeeds better than most special pleaders. So notwithstanding his partiality, Mr. Bowers' book is the best story of the origins of Jeffersonian Democracy that has been published."

Seven years later, Bowers published a biography of Beveridge, Beveridge and the Progressive Era (1932). Non-polemical and of high quality, many considered it to be Bowers’ finest work.

In his very popular histories, he promoted the idea that Thomas Jefferson had founded the Democratic Party.  (Later historians would focus on the roles of Andrew Jackson and Martin Van Buren instead.) President Franklin Roosevelt, an avid reader of Bowers and for whom Bowers' book was "a revelation", was impressed enough to build the Jefferson Memorial and appoint him the US ambassador to Spain in 1933.

The tragic era: Reconstruction
Bowers is "best known for his hyperbolic and racist popular history of Reconstruction, The Tragic Era. The Revolution after Lincoln (1929)." No subsequent work of his matched or even approached its impact. That book "helped mold a generation's racist view of Reconstruction". (See Dunning School.) He "expressed pride when southern segregationists used the book to oppose civil rights legislation a quarter century later. Praised by historians when it appeared, more recently it has been reviled by professional historians. The Tragic Era is still recommended reading on neo-Confederate Internet sites."

As he put it:

They were told, with cruel malice, that the land they had formerly cultivated as slaves was to be given them. Accepting it seriously, some had actually taken possession and planted corn and cotton.

Never have American public men in responsible positions, directing the destiny of the Nation, been so brutal, hypocritical, and corrupt. The Constitution was treated as a doormat on which politicians and army officers wiped their feet after wading in the muck.

But for the suggestions of soldiers and agitators, the former masters and slaves might easily have effected a social readjustment to their mutual benefit, but this was not the game intended. The negroes must be turned against their former masters; it was destiny perhaps that the  carpetbagger should be served. Left to themselves, the negros would have turned for leadership to the native whites, who understood them best.... Imperative, then, that they be taught to hate.

Freedom — it meant idleness, and gathering in noisy groups in the streets.... Freedom meant throwing aside all marital obligations, deserting wives and taking new ones, and in an indulgence in sexual promiscuity that soon took its toll in the victims of consumption and venereal disease.... Jubilant, and happy, the negro...was in no mood to discuss work.

The Tragic Era was a regular selection of the Literary Guild book club, and went through 13 printings before it was reissued in paperback. It has never gone out of print. It is "perhaps the single most widely read history of Reconstruction and therefore a work of considerable influence."

According to Lynch, however, those intellectual leaders who chose Bowers' book for the Literary Guild, "who have assumed the task of educating the tastes of cultivated readers, prefer books in the field of history that have high literary quality. They must of course, understand the desirability of unbiased accounts, balanced narratives, and presentations of truth for its own sake, but evidently these seemingly indispensable qualities of historical writing have been considered as secondary."

More than any other major historian, Mr. Bowers defended President Andrew Johnson, held today to be one of America's worst presidents, calling his impeachment "a farce". He also endorsed the self-described "Redeemers" who restored white government and disenfranchised blacks in the states of the former Confederacy. In short, Bower's Tragic Era was very much in the spirit of The Birth of a Nation and the Lost Cause of the Confederacy.

"Bowers had a direct partisan purpose in [The Tragic Era], hoping to discredit the Republican Party in the South and re-solidify Southern support for the Democratic Party in the aftermath of the nomination of the Catholic Al Smith." It added to Roosevelt's already favorable view of Bowers.

Books by Bowers
 The Irish Orators: A History of Ireland's Fight for Freedom (1916)
 The Life of John Worth Kern (1918) Introduction by Vice President Thomas R. Marshall.
 The Party Battles of the Jackson Period (1922)
 Jefferson and Hamilton: The Struggle for Democracy in America (1925; German translation, 1948; Italian translation, 1955) Long review in The New York Times.
 
 
 
 Beveridge and the Progressive Era (1932)
 Jefferson in Power: The Death Struggle of the Federalists (1936)
 The Spanish Adventures of Washington Irving (1940; Spanish translation, 1946)
 The Young Jefferson, 1743-1789 (1945)
 Pierre Vergniaud: Voice of the French Revolution (1950)
 Making Democracy a Reality. Jefferson, Jackson, and Polk (J. P. Young lectures in American history, 1954)
 My Mission to Spain: Watching the Rehearsal for World War II (1954; French translation, 1956; Spanish translation, 1966; Italian translation, 1957)
 Chile Through Embassy Windows, 1939-1953 (1958; Spanish translation, 1939)
 My Life: The Memoirs of Claude Bowers (1962)
 Indianapolis in the 'Gay Nineties': High School Diaries of Claude G. Bowers, edited by Holman Hamilton and Gayle Thornbrough (1964)

Articles, columns, and speeches by Bowers

Further reading
 Jones, Kenneth Paul, ed. U.S. Diplomats in Europe, 1919–41 (ABC-CLIO. 1981) online on Bowsers' role in Europe, pp 129–148.

 
 
 Jessner, Sabine, and Peter J. Sehlinger. "Claude G. Bowers: A Partisan Hoosier." Indiana Magazine of History (1987): 217–243. online
 Roberts, George C. "Claude G. Bowers: Hoosier Historian and the Politics of Yesterday, Today, and Tomorrow." Proceedings of the Indiana Academy of the Social Sciences. Vol. 17. (1982).

Archival material
 The bulk of Bowers papers is in the Lilly Library, Indiana University, Bloomington, Indiana.
 Correspondence with his friend and Democratic party leader James Farley is in the Farley papers in the Library of Congress.
 Correspondence with Robert Walton Moore relating to the Spanish Civil War (1936–1939) is in the Franklin D. Roosevelt Presidential Library and Museum, Hyde Park, New York
 Correspondence with Theodore Fred Kuper (1932–1953) is held by the Huntington Library, San Marino, California
 The Columbia University Oral History Collection interviewed Bowers in 1959. A transcript is available.

References

External links
 Indiana Journalism Hall of Fame - Claude G. Bowers

|-

|-

1878 births
1958 deaths
20th-century American historians
Ambassadors of the United States to Chile
Ambassadors of the United States to Spain
20th-century American memoirists
American political writers
Dunning School
Journalists from Indiana
Democratic Party members of the Indiana House of Representatives
People from Westfield, Indiana
Politicians from Terre Haute, Indiana
Writers from Terre Haute, Indiana
20th-century American male writers
American male non-fiction writers
Shortridge High School alumni
20th-century American diplomats
Neo-Confederates